Bucchianico (locally Vicchièneche) is a comune and town in the province of Chieti in the Abruzzo region of Italy.

Geography
The town is situated on a hill between the  valleys Alento river and Bucchianico Foro, and has a view extending from the Maiella to the Adriatic Sea. Its territory is hilly,  with a significant presence of olive groves and vineyards.

The municipality borders with Casacanditella, Casalincontrada, Chieti, Fara Filiorum Petri, Ripa Teatina, Roccamontepiano, Vacri and Villamagna.

People
Camillus de Lellis, a Roman Catholic priest who founded the Camillians

References

External links

Official website

Cities and towns in Abruzzo